Small may refer to:

Science and technology
 SMALL, an ALGOL-like programming language
 Small (anatomy), the lumbar region of the back
 Small (journal), a nano-science publication
 <small>, an HTML element that defines smaller text

Arts and entertainment

Fictional characters
 Small, in the British children's show Big & Small

Other uses
 Small, of little size
 Small (surname)
 "Small", a song from the album The Cosmos Rocks by Queen + Paul Rodgers

See also
 Smal (disambiguation)
 List of people known as the Small
 Smalls (disambiguation)